Monica Goermann (born September 1, 1964) is a Canadian former gymnast. She is also the owner, artistic director, and choreographer of Monica's Danz Gym. She was named to the 1980 Canadian Olympic team, however the team did not compete due to Canada's decision to boycott the Olympics in Moscow.

Personal life
Goermann was born on September 1, 1964, in Winnipeg, Manitoba, where she attended Dakota Collegiate. Her parents Elfriede and Wolfgang Goermann were gymnastics coaches who founded the Winnipeg Gymnastics Center in 1997.

Goermann has a daughter who is also a competitive gymnast.

Career
From 1977 to 1983 Monica was a member of the Canadian National Gymnastics Team and competed all over the world, from Japan to Russia. Her signature grace & artistic flair was widely known; Monica is a five-time medalist at the Pan American Games. Goermann won the all around title at the Pan American Games in 1979. In 1991, Goermann was inducted into the 
Manitoba Sports Hall of Fame.

Monica's Danz Gym was established in 1993 after her successful career as a coach and choreographer for the Guatemalan National Team.

References

Canadian female artistic gymnasts
Living people
Sportspeople from Winnipeg
Gymnasts at the 1978 Commonwealth Games
Commonwealth Games medallists in gymnastics
Commonwealth Games gold medallists for Canada
Commonwealth Games silver medallists for Canada
Pan American Games medalists in gymnastics
1964 births
Pan American Games gold medalists for Canada
Pan American Games bronze medalists for Canada
Gymnasts at the 1979 Pan American Games
Medalists at the 1979 Pan American Games
People from St. Vital, Winnipeg
Medallists at the 1978 Commonwealth Games